Fuhualu station is a station on Line 9 of Chongqing Rail Transit in Chongqing municipality, China, which opened in 2022. It is located in Yuzhong District.

Station structure
There are two island platforms at this station, located separately on two floors. The lower one is for Line 9 trains traveling in both directions, while the upper one is reserved for Line 18 (currently under construction) trains.

References

Railway stations in Chongqing
Railway stations in China opened in 2022
Chongqing Rail Transit stations